Rakefet Russak-Aminoach (Hebrew: רקפת רוסק עמינח; born February 1, 1966)  served as President and CEO of Bank Leumi le-Israel B.M.  since May 1, 2012, to October 2019. Since September 2020, Russak-Aminoach is the Managing Partner of Team8 Fintech, a company-building platform part of the Team8 Group, focused on building and scaling fintech companies.

Russak-Aminoach was listed in Fortune Magazine's "100 Most Powerful Women in Business" list three times (2015, 2016, 2018 ), and was the only Israeli on these lists. Rakefet is considered a pioneer in the digital banking field and is known for launching Pepper, Israel's first mobile-only bank.

Early life and education 
Russak-Aminoach was born and raised in Ramat Aviv, Israel. She is the daughter of Rachel and Shmuel Russak, CPA, and the second of three daughters. After completing high school, Russak-Aminoach immediately began her academic studies at Tel Aviv University, within the framework of 'Atuda', the Israeli military's Academic Reserves Program. After graduating with a B.A. (summa cum laude) in economics and accounting, she completed her accounting internship at her father's firm.

At the age of 21, Russak-Aminoach began her M.B.A. studies at Tel Aviv University, specializing in Finance, while lecturing at the university's Accounting Faculty at the same time. Again, she graduated with honors (cum laude) and later on completed her LLB at Tel Aviv University. Between the ages of 24–26, Russak-Aminoach served in the Israel Defense Forces as a lecturer in the IDF Command & Staff College, where she taught Operations Research and Project Management.

Career
Between 1992 and 1994, Russak-Aminoach served as personal assistant to Galia Maor, then Deputy CEO of Bank Leumi le-Israel. In 1995, she became a partner at Somekh-Chaikin CPA firm (KPMG Israel). Five years later, in August 2000, she was appointed CEO of the firm.

In January 2004, at the age of 38, Russak-Aminoach was appointed head of the Corporate Division of Bank Leumi, becoming the youngest management member in the history of the Bank. On July 1, 2011, she was appointed Senior Deputy to then CEO of the Bank, Galia Maor.

Russak-Aminoach heads the Association of Friends of 'Aharai!' ('Follow Me!'), a non-profit organization engaged in developing and encouraging leadership and social involvement amongst youth in the outlying areas of Israel.

CEO of Bank Leumi 
On May 1, 2012, Russak-Aminoach was appointed CEO of Bank Leumi. Six years after her appointment, Leumi established itself as the leading bank in Israel in terms of profits, market cap, and innovation. To reach this landmark, Russak- Aminoach led a turnaround within the Leumi Group, focusing on digital transformation and enhancing efficiency.

These steps included an extensive streamlining program across the Group, which resulted in a reduction of about 20% in the Group's workforce, merging of branches and business lines, exiting the Bank's global private banking operations. All this led to a significant decrease in the Bank's total expenses. In addition, Russak-Aminoach led major steps to improve the Bank's capital adequacy. During this period, Leumi attained a credit portfolio with minimal credit loss expenses, one of the best of its kind.

During Russak-Aminoach's tenure the bank received certain alleviations throughout the US tax evasion investigation because of the complete cooperation it demonstrated, concluding the investigation already at the end of 2014. In comparison, Poalim bank paid the regulators massive amount of $500 million more than Leumi, and the total difference of $750 million (including consultants’ fee) was due to the US regulators’ realization that Poalim is buying time and does not cooperate fully with them.

In May 2014, Russak-Aminoach decided to significantly expand Leumi's high-tech banking operations with the establishment of LeumiTech, the Group's high-tech banking arm, which provides tailor-made financial services to Israeli high-tech companies operating around the globe. Based in Tel Aviv, LeumiTech also operates in London, New York and Palo Alto. In August 2018, LeumiTech announced it would expand its activity in the US to include non-Israeli related companies.

In October 2014, the Israeli social activist Barak Cohen began to coordinate the "Ba'im LaBanka'im" ("Coming to the Bankers") protest against senior officials in the banking system, including Russak-Aminoach. As part of the activity, Cohen read slogans in condemnation of Russak-Aminoach near the high school where she studies and scattered posters condemning her in the school yard. The court issued a restraining order to Cohen and his teammates from Russak-Aminoach and Zion Kenan, for stalking. In May 2019, Cohen pleaded guilty in a plea bargain to invasion of privacy as part of the "Ba'im LaBanka'im" protest actions, and in November 2019 he was sentenced to six months probation and a fine of 20,000 NIS.

In early 2017, in light of the Bank's results, Bank Leumi announced a new dividend policy of 40% of profits, following a long period with no dividend payouts. Since Russak-Aminoach took office as CEO, and until the end of the third quarter of 2018, Leumi's share price has more than doubled.

In January 2018, Russak-Aminoach led a strategic investment into Bank Leumi USA, a fully owned subsidiary of the Leumi Group, with the sale of 15% of Bank Leumi USA to Endicott Capital Management and MSD Capital L.P. The agreement reflected a net worth value of approximately USD 1 billion for Bank Leumi USA, 20% above its equity capital.

Six months later, Russak-Aminoach promoted an agreement with US private equity fund Warburg Pincus for the sale of Leumi Card, Leumi Group's credit card subsidiary, for NIS 2.5 billion, 30% above its equity capital. The agreement positioned Leumi as the first bank in Israel to implement the recommendations of the Government Committee for Increasing Competition in the Banking Industry ("The Strum Committee").

In July 2019, she announced that she was stepping down as CEO.

Digital banking 
Russak Aminoach is considered a pioneer in the global digital banking arena. Under her leadership, Bank Leumi began executing a business strategy that focuses, among others, on digital innovation and implementation of advanced technologies across all the Bank's business lines.

In early 2016, she established Leumi's 'Digital Banking Division', which was responsible for setting up Israel's first fully digital bank, alongside spearheading the Bank's digital transformation, marketing, innovation and Big Data activities.

In February 2017, Leumi launched Pepper Pay, a P2P mobile payments app. Five months later, Leumi officially launched Pepper, a unique, fully digital bank, enabling complete current account management via mobile only.

In light of its achievements in the digital field, Bank Leumi has won several prestigious awards in recent years, including "Best Corporate Digital Bank in Israel" (Global Finance Magazine, 2016), and "Best Digital Bank in Israel" (Global Finance Magazine, 2017).    

In May 2018, Leumi won the Dell Technologies "Innovator Award" for the foundation of Pepper. Several months later, Russak-Aminoach announced her plans to expand Pepper to the US.

In December 2018, Leumi was named "Bank of the Year in Israel" by The Banker magazine, mainly due to the Bank's ongoing commitment to digital innovation.

Recognition 
In September 2015, Russak-Aminoach was listed, for the first time, in Fortune magazine's list of "The World's 100 Most Powerful Women in Business". She was ranked 23rd in Europe, Middle East and Africa.

In December 2015, Russak-Aminoach was selected as one of the "Ten Most Innovative CEO's in Banking" by the US Fintech blog Bank Innovation.

In September 2016, Russak-Aminoach was listed, once again, in Fortune's "100 Most Powerful Women in Business" list. She was ranked 43rd in the international list.

In November 2016, Russak-Aminoach was included in the BBC's "100 Women 2016" list, which consists of inspirational and influential women around the globe.

In December 2016, Russak-Aminoach was selected, once again, as one of the "Ten Most Innovative CEO's in Banking" by Bank Innovation.

In April 2017, Bank Leumi was ranked No. 13 in the world in the Equileap International Index which every year ranks the world's 200 leading companies according to their performance on gender equality at work.  According to Leumi's 2017 CSR report, 52% of the Bank's management team and 44% of senior management are female.

In October 2018, Russak-Aminoach was listed, for the third time, in Fortune's "100 Most Powerful Women in Business" list, ranking 43rd in the international list.

In May 2019, Russak-Aminoach was listed in Financial News' "50 Most Influential Women in Middle East Finance 2019" list.

Rakefet Russak-Aminoach has appeared as a guest  speaker at several prestigious international conferences, including Financial Times Innovate(November 2016, London), where she delivered an opening keynote; Money 20/20 (October 2017, Las Vegas), where she spoke on the future of banking and her decision to launch the digital bank Pepper; and DLD Munich (January 2019, Munich), where she explained the difference between applying a "Digital Skin" strategy as opposed to providing a real digital experience – building it from the core.

Personal details 
Rakefet Russak-Aminoach is married to Reem Aminoach, former member of the IDF General Staff Forum, head of the Budget Department at the Ministry of Defence, chief financial advisor to the Chief of Staff of the IDF and head of the IDF's Budgetary Array. They have two daughters and reside in Ramat Hasharon, Israel.

External links 

 Launching A Fintech Platform For Growing Unicorns, Forbes, September 15, 2020 
She was one of the world’s few female bank CEOs. Now she’s founding a fintech venture group, Fortune, September 15, 2020
Charlotte Clarke, Women in Business — Rakefet Russak-Aminoach, Financial Times, October 4, 2015
 Rakefet Russak Aminoach at Financial Times Innovate, November 12, 2016
 Rakefet Russak Aminoach at Money 20\20, October 23, 2017
Israel Is Undergoing A Female Banking Revolution, Russak-Aminoach Leads The Way, Forbes, December 30, 2018
Rakefet Russak Aminoach at DLD Munich, January 20, 2019
What is the future of banking?, Raconteur, May 1, 2019
"Flanker" banks are seeking to combine the old and new, The Economist, May 2, 2019
Tech's raid on the banks, Money talks podcast, The Economist, May 7, 2019
Rakefet Russak Aminoach at MPW London 2019: Banking on a Digital Future, June 4, 2019

References

Living people
Israeli bankers
1966 births
BBC 100 Women
Tel Aviv University alumni